Scontrone is a comune and town in the province of L'Aquila, in the Abruzzo region of central Italy. In 2021, Poste Italiane (Italian post office) launched the service of ATM.

References

Cities and towns in Abruzzo